Berlin-Friedenau is a railway station in Berlin, Germany. Though it is named after the nearby Friedenau locality, the station officially is located in the southern area of the Schöneberg district. It was opened in 1891 with the Wannseebahn rapid transit railway. Today it is served by the S1 line of the Berlin S-Bahn.

References

External links
Station information 

Berlin S-Bahn stations
Railway stations in Berlin
Buildings and structures in Tempelhof-Schöneberg
Railway stations in Germany opened in 1891